The men's épée was one of eight fencing events on the fencing at the 1984 Summer Olympics programme. It was the nineteenth appearance of the event. The competition was held from August 7 to 8 1984. 63 fencers from 26 nations competed. Each nation was limited to 3 fencers. The event was won by Philippe Boisse of France, the nation's first victory in the men's individual épée since 1928 and fourth overall (second-most after Italy's six). France also took bronze, with Philippe Riboud winning the bronze medal match after losing to Boisse in the semifinals. It was Riboud's second consecutive bronze medal in the event, making him the 10th man to earn multiple medals in the individual épée. Silver went to Björne Väggö of Sweden. Hungary's four-Games podium streak in the event ended due to that nation joining the Soviet-led boycott.

Background

This was the 19th appearance of the event, which was not held at the first Games in 1896 (with only foil and sabre events held) but has been held at every Summer Olympics since 1900.

One of the six finalists from 1980 returned: bronze medalist Philippe Riboud of France. Riboud was also the 1979 World Champion (and would win again in 1986). Two of the last three World Champions (Zoltán Székely in 1981 and Jenő Pap in 1982) were from Hungary, which boycotted the Games. The reigning World Champion, Elmar Borrmann of West Germany, competed in Los Angeles.

Bolivia, the People's Republic of China, Chinese Taipei, Saudi Arabia, and the Virgin Islands each made their debut in the event. Belgium, France, Great Britain, Sweden, and the United States each appeared for the 17th time, tied for most among nations.

Competition format

The 1984 tournament used a three-phase format similar to that of 1976 and 1980, though the final phase was different.

The first phase was a multi-round round-robin pool play format; each fencer in a pool faced each other fencer in that pool once. There were three pool rounds: 
 The first round had 12 pools of 5 or 6 fencers each, with the top 4 in each pool advancing.
 The second round had 8 pools of 6 fencers each, with the top 3 in each pool advancing.
 The third round had 4 pools of 6 fencers each, with the top 4 in each pool advancing.

The second phase was a truncated double-elimination tournament. Four fencers advanced to the final round through the winners brackets and four more advanced via the repechage.

The final phase was a single elimination tournament with a bronze medal match. (This was changed from a 6-man final round-robin pool in previous years.)

Bouts in the round-robin pools were to 5 touches; bouts in the double-elimination and final rounds were to 10 touches.

Schedule

All times are Pacific Daylight Time (UTC-7)

Results

Round 1

Round 1 Pool A

Round 1 Pool B

Round 1 Pool C

Round 1 Pool D

Round 1 Pool E

Round 1 Pool F

Round 1 Pool G

Round 1 Pool H

Round 1 Pool I

Round 1 Pool J

Round 1 Pool K

Round 1 Pool L

Round 2

Round 2 Pool A

Round 2 Pool B

Round 2 Pool C

Round 2 Pool D

Round 2 Pool E

Round 2 Pool F

Round 2 Pool G

Round 2 Pool H

Round 3

Round 3 Pool A

Round 3 Pool B

Round 3 Pool C

Round 3 Pool D

Double elimination rounds

Winners brackets

Winners group 1

Winners group 2

Winners group 3

Winners group 4

Losers brackets

Losers group 1

Losers group 2

Losers group 3

Losers group 4

Final round

Final classification

References

Epee men
Men's events at the 1984 Summer Olympics